Sarritor is a genus of poachers native to the northern Pacific Ocean.

Species
There are currently three recognized species in this genus:
 Sarritor frenatus (C. H. Gilbert, 1896) (Sawback poacher)
 Sarritor knipowitschi Lindberg & Andriashev, 1937
 Sarritor leptorhynchus (C. H. Gilbert, 1896) (Longnose poacher)

References

Agoninae